Crataegus ancisa, the Mississippi hawthorn, is a species of hawthorn that grows as a shrub or tree, and is endemic to the Southern United States, in North America.

Distribution
Crataegus ancisa is found in Mississippi and Alabama.

References

ancisa
Flora of Alabama
Flora of Mississippi
Endemic flora of the United States
Flora without expected TNC conservation status